The 2018–19 Northern State Wolves men's basketball team represented Northern State University in the 2018-19 NCAA Division II men's basketball season. The Wolves were led by ninth year head coach Paul Sather and played their home games at Wachs Arena in Aberdeen, South Dakota. They competed as members of the Northern Sun Intercollegiate Conference. After winning the NSIC tournament, the Wolves received an automatic bid into the 2019 NCAA Division II men's basketball tournament. They received the #2 seed in the regional tournament, but lost in the first round to Southeastern Oklahoma State in overtime by a score of 115–103.

Previous season
During the previous season, the Wolves ended the season with a school record for wins (36) and appeared in the D2 national championship game for the first time in school history. They lost in the championship game to the Ferris State Bulldogs by a score of 69–71.

Roster

Schedule and results

|-
!colspan=12 style=| Non-conference regular season

|-
!colspan=12 style=| NSIC regular season

|-
!colspan=12 style=| NSIC Tournament

|-
!colspan=12 style=| NCAA Central Regional

|-

References

Northern State Wolves men's basketball seasons
Northern State
Northern State Wolves
Northern State Wolves